Diane Coates (born 25 June 1932) is a British athlete. She competed in the women's javelin throw at the 1952 Summer Olympics.

References

External links
 

1932 births
Living people
Athletes (track and field) at the 1952 Summer Olympics
British female javelin throwers
Olympic athletes of Great Britain
Sportspeople from Oxford